In operator theory, Naimark's dilation theorem is a result that characterizes positive operator valued measures. It can be viewed as a consequence of Stinespring's dilation theorem.

Some preliminary notions 

for all x and y. Some terminology for describing such measures are:

 E is called regular if the scalar valued measure

is a regular Borel measure, meaning all compact sets have finite total variation and the measure of a set can be approximated by those of open sets.

 E is called bounded if .
 E is called positive if E(B) is a positive operator for all B.
 E is called self-adjoint  if E(B) is self-adjoint for all B.

We will assume throughout that E is regular.

Let C(X) denote the abelian C*-algebra of continuous functions on X. If E is regular and bounded, it induces a map  in the obvious way:

The boundedness of E implies, for all h of unit norm

This shows  is a bounded operator for all f, and  itself is a bounded linear map as well.

 If E is positive, then , viewed as a map between C*-algebras, is also positive.

Take f and g to be indicator functions of Borel sets and we see that  is a homomorphism if and only if E is spectral.

 Similarly, to say  respects the * operation means

The LHS is

and the RHS is

So, taking f a sequence of continuous functions increasing to the indicator function of B, we get , i.e. E(B) is self adjoint.

 Combining the previous two facts gives the conclusion that  is a *-homomorphism if and only if E is spectral and self adjoint. (When E is spectral and self adjoint, E is said to be a projection-valued measure or PVM.)

Naimark's theorem 

The theorem reads as follows: Let E be a positive L(H)-valued measure on X. There exists a Hilbert space K, a bounded operator , and a self-adjoint, spectral L(K)-valued measure on X, F, such that

Proof 

We now sketch the proof. The argument passes E to the induced map  and uses Stinespring's dilation theorem. By Stinespring's result, there exists a Hilbert space K, a *-homomorphism , and operator  such that

Since π is a *-homomorphism, its corresponding operator-valued measure F is spectral and self adjoint. It is easily seen that F has the desired properties.

Finite-dimensional case 

In the finite-dimensional case, there is a somewhat more explicit formulation.

Suppose now , therefore C(X) is the finite-dimensional algebra , and H has finite dimension m. A positive operator-valued measure E then assigns each i a positive semidefinite m × m matrix . Naimark's theorem now states that there is a projection-valued measure on X whose restriction is E.

Of particular interest is the special case when  where I is the identity operator. (See the article on POVM for relevant applications.) In this case, the induced map  is unital. Under such assumptions, the case  is excluded and we must have either
  and E is already a projection-valued measure (because  if and only if  is an orthonormal basis),
  and  does not consist of mutually orthogonal projections.
For the second possibility, the problem of finding a suitable projection-valued measure now becomes the following problem. By assumption, the non-square matrix

If we can find a  matrix N where

is a n × n unitary matrix, the projection-valued measure whose elements are projections onto the column vectors of U will then have the desired properties. In principle, such a N can always be found.

Spelling
In the physics literature, it is common to see the spelling “Neumark” instead of “Naimark.” The latter variant is according to the romanization of Russian used in translation of Soviet journals, with diacritics omitted (originally Naĭmark). The former is according to the etymology of the surname of Mark Naimark.

References
V. Paulsen, Completely Bounded Maps and Operator Algebras, Cambridge University Press, 2003.

Operator theory
Theorems in measure theory
Theorems in functional analysis